Muskat (Muskat the spice merchant, compare Kanehl, Zimt, Safran and so on) is a surname. Notable people with the surname include:

Joyce Muskat, American television writer
Lisa Muskat, American film producer
Morris Muskat (1906–1998), American petroleum engineer
Tamir Muskat, Israeli musician

See also
Muscat (disambiguation)
Muscat (surname)

Surnames of German origin